The Jungbocheon in South Korea is a tributary of the Hwanggujicheon, which in turn empties into the Yellow Sea at Asan Bay.  Its source is Eupjang Reservoir, also known as Pajang Reservoir, near the North Suwon exit of the Yeongdong Expressway and at the bottom of the southwest slope of Gwanggyosan, on the border between Yongin and Suwon.  It then flows south through the city of Suwon, being fed from the east by Ilwang Reservoir.  It passes by Hwaseo Station and then forms Seoho, meaning West Lake.  It then passes out of urban Suwon, still flowing south, till it joins the Hwanggujicheon.

See also
 Rivers of Asia
 Rivers of Korea
 Geography of South Korea

Rivers of South Korea